Angelo II Acciaioli (1349–1408) was a cardinal and Archbishop of Patras 1395–1400.

Angelo Acciaioli may also refer to:
Angelo Acciaioli (bishop) (1298–1357), bishop
Angelo Acciaioli di Cassano, Italian diplomat

See also
 Acciaioli